The water skiing competitions at the 2013 Mediterranean Games in Mersin took place between 21 June and 23 June at the Mersin Atatürk Park.

Athletes competed in 2 events. Tricks and wakeboard competitions were not held because too few nations applied.

Medal summary

Events

Medal table
Key:

References

Sports at the 2013 Mediterranean Games
2013
Med